Nikolay Karpenko (born August 10, 1981 in Almaty) is a Kazakhstani ski jumper who has been competing since 2005. Competing in two Winter Olympics, he earned his best finish of 12th in the team large hill at Turin in 2006 while earning his best individual finish was 29th in the individual normal hill event at Vancouver in four years later.

At the FIS Nordic World Ski Championships, Karpenko has finished 11th in team events three times (2005: large, normal; 2007: large) and 26th in the individual large hill (2009) events.

His best World Cup finish was eighth in a team flying hill event at Germany in 2009 while his best individual finish was 19th in an individual large hill event also in Germany in 2007.

References
 

1981 births
Kazakhstani male ski jumpers
Living people
Olympic ski jumpers of Kazakhstan
Ski jumpers at the 2006 Winter Olympics
Ski jumpers at the 2010 Winter Olympics
Asian Games medalists in ski jumping
Ski jumpers at the 2011 Asian Winter Games
Asian Games silver medalists for Kazakhstan
Asian Games bronze medalists for Kazakhstan
Medalists at the 2011 Asian Winter Games
21st-century Kazakhstani people